The Division of St George was an Australian Electoral Division in the state of New South Wales. It was located in the southern suburbs of Sydney, and covered the suburbs of Hurstville, Rockdale and Arncliffe.

The Division was named after the Sydney district of St George. It was proclaimed at the redistribution of 11 May 1949. For most of its existence, it was a marginal seat that frequently changed hands between the Labor Party and the Liberal Party. Unlike some marginal seats, it was not considered a barometer for winning government; of its seven members (two of which held it on separate stints), four spent at least one term in opposition.

At the redistribution of 31 January 1992, it was abolished and replaced by the Division of Watson, named after Hon. Chris Watson, the first Labor Prime Minister of Australia.

Members

Election results

St George
St George (Sydney)